The term iç oğlan ("Inner [Palace] Boy") refers to the boy servants or pages who had been taken from Christian parents in the Balkans and converted, according to the devşirme system in the Ottoman Empire, and who worked in the Enderûn, that is, the Inner Palace, one of the three parts of Topkapı Palace in Istanbul. In other words, they were the Inner Palace servants, the staff serving in the private apartments of the Sultan and his family. 

The same term was also used for certain members of the Janissaries.

As pages the Itch-oglans were trained to be courtiers and also in the arts of administrator and commander, with many being Albanians.

References

Sources
 

Turkish words and phrases
Ottoman court